The 1986 United States House of Representatives elections in Texas occurred on November 4, 1986, to elect the members of the state of Texas's delegation to the United States House of Representatives. Texas had twenty-seven seats in the House, apportioned according to the 1980 United States Census.

These elections occurred simultaneously with the United States Senate elections of 1986, the United States House elections in other states, and various state and local elections.

Democrats maintained their majority of U.S. House seats from Texas, but Republicans retained the four seats they gained in 1984 under the coattails of Ronald Reagan's re-election.

Overview

Congressional Districts

District 1 
Incumbent Democrat Sam B. Hall resigned to become a U.S. District Judge. This prompted a special election to be held. Republicans saw this special election as a prime opportunity to demonstrate the political realignment of East Texas, as the district had supported Republicans Ronald Reagan and Phil Gramm in 1984. Gramm had arranged Hall's appointment to the judiciary in an attempt to see a Republican elected from the area. In the end, however, Democrat Jim Chapman narrowly won the election in a runoff. He ran for re-election unopposed.

District 2 
Incumbent Democrat Charlie Wilson ran for re-election.

District 3 
Incumbent Republican Steve Bartlett ran for re-election.

District 4 
Incumbent Democrat Ralph Hall ran for re-election.

District 5 
Incumbent Democrat John Wiley Bryant ran for re-election.

District 6 
Incumbent Republican Joe Barton ran for re-election.

District 7 
Incumbent Republican Bill Archer ran for re-election.

District 8 
Incumbent Republican Jack Fields ran for re-election.

District 9 
Incumbent Democrat Jack Brooks ran for re-election.

District 10 
Incumbent Democrat J. J. Pickle ran for re-election.

District 11 
Incumbent Democrat Marvin Leath ran for re-election unopposed.

District 12 
Incumbent Democrat Jim Wright ran for re-election. He was subsequently elected Speaker of the House.

District 13 
Incumbent Republican Beau Boulter ran for re-election.

District 14 
Incumbent Republican Mac Sweeney ran for re-election.

District 15 
Incumbent Democrat Kika de la Garza ran for re-election unopposed.

District 16 
Incumbent Democrat Ronald D. Coleman ran for re-election.

District 17 
Incumbent Democrat Charles Stenholm ran for re-election unopposed.

District 18 
Incumbent Democrat Mickey Leland ran for re-election.

District 19 
Incumbent Republican Larry Combest ran for re-election.

District 20 
Incumbent Democrat Henry B. González ran for re-election unopposed.

District 21 
Incumbent Republican Tom Loeffler retired to run for governor.

District 22 
Incumbent Republican Tom DeLay ran for re-election.

District 23 
Incumbent Democrat Albert Bustamante ran for re-election.

District 24 
Incumbent Democrat Martin Frost ran for re-election.

District 25 
Incumbent Democrat Michael A. Andrews ran for re-election unopposed.

District 26 
Incumbent Republican Dick Armey ran for re-election. Former representative Tom Vandergriff had considered running to regain the seat he had previously held from 1983-1985, but he ultimately declined.

District 27 
Incumbent Democrat Solomon Ortiz ran for re-election unopposed.

References

1986
Texas
1986 Texas elections